A gas explosion occurred on December 11, 1970, at a building at Park Row and Ann Street in Manhattan, New York City, killing 12 people and injuring more than 60. The two upper floors of the building had been recently converted into a Chinese restaurant, which required a new gas line to be installed. A city inspector failed to notice defects in the new line and issued a certification on December 2. Although gas service was not scheduled to be turned on until December 14, the owner of the restaurant "clandestinely" arranged to have the gas turned on earlier, on December 11. Several hours later, at around 2:00pm, the unopened Chinese restaurant exploded, killing and injuring patrons in a nearby restaurant and in a barbershop, both colocated in the building. Patrons in a tavern on the first floor of the building were also injured, as were people walking on the sidewalk next to the building and workers in neighboring buildings. The five-alarm fire that followed sent flames  into the air. The blaze was brought under control in 90 minutes by 200 firemen. In 1983, the New York Court of Appeals ruled that New York City was not liable for the explosion, stating that "a general obligation to all members of the public was not sufficient to establish liability in particular cases."

References

Explosions in 1970
1970 disasters in the United States
1970 in New York City
Building collapses in the United States
Disasters in New York City
Gas explosions in the United States
1970s in Manhattan
Consolidated Edison
December 1970 events in the United States